Eğil (Hittite: 𒅔𒃲𒀀𒉿 Ingalawa) is a town and district of Diyarbakır Province of Turkey. As of 2018, the district's population is 23,369. The elected mayor Mustafa Akkul of the Peoples' Democratic Party  (HDP) was dismissed on the 23 March 2020 and replaced by a trustee. The current Kaymakam is İdris Arslan.  

Eğil is an ancient city 50 km away from Diyarbakır with many ancient forts and caves dating to the time of the Armenian kingdom of Sophene. It is identified with Carcathiocerta, the capital of the Kingdom of Sophene, and the ancient Armenian religious center of Angegh-tun (Angełtun). It is known as the "City of Prophets."  It has been ruled by the Armenians, the Assyrians, the Romans, the Byzantines, the Abbasids, the Seljuks and the Ottoman Empire.  

In 2018 parts of a village re-emerged in Eğil in the Çakırören neighbourhood, after the Dicle Dam suffered water level decrease due to a burst of one of the gates. It is also the location of a supposed tomb of Elisha, which is located in the Kale neighborhood of Eğil.

History 

During the Bronze Age, the city was known as Ingalawa by the Hittites. Most scholars identify Eğil with the ancient city of Carcathiocerta. The city, with its strategic location overlooking the west bank of the Tigris, is the oldest in the region, with remains dating back to the Assyrian and Hellenistic periods. Later on, the city was known in Armenian as Angł, capital of the district of Angełtun, which was known as Ingilene in Greco-Roman sources. It was part of the larger province of Sophene. Armenian sources described Angł as housing "the tombs of the former kings of Armenia", apparently taking the rulers of Sophene as a branch of the Armenian kings' dynasty. The rock-cut tombs still exist today at Eğil.

Notable Locals 

 Muammer Yıldırım, footballer
 Zelal Baturay, Footballer

Gallery

References 

Kurdish settlements in Turkey
Populated places in Diyarbakır Province
Districts of Diyarbakır Province